Juan Carlos Muñiz ( 1984 – 4 March 2022) was a Mexican journalist who covered crimes for the website Testigo Minero. He was the seventh journalist to be murdered in Mexico in 2022.

Biography
Muñiz studied journalism at the Autonomous University of Fresnillo. He was a crime writer and Muñiz was shot and killed while riding home from work in a taxi for reporting on a recent crime in the city of Fresnillo. His death shocked the state of Zacatecas, and mobilized people to protest his death.

See also
Mexican Drug War
List of journalists killed in Mexico

References

1980s births
2022 deaths
Assassinated Mexican journalists
Place of birth missing
Deaths by firearm in Mexico
Journalists killed in the Mexican Drug War